

Events

Pre-1600
1395 – Battle of Rovine: The Wallachians defeat an invading Ottoman army.
1521 – Edward Stafford, 3rd Duke of Buckingham, is executed for treason.
1527 – Pánfilo de Narváez departs Spain to explore Florida with 600 men – by 1536 only four survive.
1536 – George Boleyn, 2nd Viscount Rochford and four other men are executed for treason.
  1536   – Henry VIII and Anne Boleyn's marriage is annulled.
1590 – Anne of Denmark is crowned Queen of Scotland.

1601–1900
1642 – Paul de Chomedey, Sieur de Maisonneuve founds the Ville Marie de Montréal.
1648 – Emperor Ferdinand III defeats Maximilian I of Bavaria in the Battle of Zusmarshausen.
1673 – Louis Jolliet and Jacques Marquette begin exploring the Mississippi River.
1756 – Seven Years' War formally begins when Great Britain declares war on France
1760 – French forces besieging Quebec retreat after the Royal Navy arrives to relieve the British garrison.
1792 – The New York Stock Exchange is formed under the Buttonwood Agreement.
1805 – Muhammad Ali becomes Wāli of Egypt.
1809 – Emperor Napoleon I orders the annexation of the Papal States to the French Empire.
1814 – Occupation of Monaco changes from French to Austrian.
  1814   – The Constitution of Norway is signed and Crown Prince Christian Frederick of Denmark is elected King of Norway by the Norwegian Constituent Assembly.
1859 – Members of the Melbourne Football Club codified the first rules of Australian rules football.
1863 – Rosalía de Castro publishes Cantares Gallegos, the first book in the Galician language.
1865 – The International Telegraph Union (later the International Telecommunication Union) is established in Paris.
1875 – Aristides wins the first Kentucky Derby with the jockey Oliver Lewis (2:37.75).
  1900   – The children's novel The Wonderful Wizard of Oz, by L. Frank Baum, is first published in the United States. The first copy is given to the author's sister.

1901–present
1902 – Greek archaeologist Valerios Stais discovers the Antikythera mechanism, an ancient mechanical analog computer.
1914 – The Protocol of Corfu is signed, recognising full autonomy to Northern Epirus under nominal Albanian sovereignty.
1915 – The last British Liberal Party government (led by H. H. Asquith) falls.
1933 – Vidkun Quisling and Johan Bernhard Hjort form Nasjonal Samling — the national-socialist party of Norway.
1937 – Spanish Civil War: The Largo Caballero government resigns in the wake of the Barcelona May Days, leading Juan Negrín to form a government, without the anarcho-syndicalist CNT, in its stead.
1939 – The Columbia Lions and the Princeton Tigers play in the United States' first televised sporting event, a collegiate baseball game in New York City.
1940 – World War II: Germany occupies Brussels, Belgium.
1943 – World War II: Dambuster Raids commence by No. 617 Squadron RAF.
1954 – The United States Supreme Court hands down a unanimous decision in Brown v. Board of Education of Topeka, Kansas, outlawing racial segregation in public schools.
1967 – Six-Day War: President Gamal Abdel Nasser of Egypt demands dismantling of the peace-keeping UN Emergency Force in Egypt.
1969 – Venera program: Soviet Venera 6 begins its descent into the atmosphere of Venus, sending back atmospheric data before being crushed by pressure.
1973 – Watergate scandal: Televised hearings begin in the United States Senate.
1974 – The Troubles: Thirty-three civilians are killed and 300 injured when the Ulster Volunteer Force (UVF) detonates four car bombs in Dublin and Monaghan, Republic of Ireland. 
  1974   – Police in Los Angeles raid the Symbionese Liberation Army's headquarters, killing six members, including Camilla Hall.
1977 – Nolan Bushnell opened the first ShowBiz Pizza Place (later renamed Chuck E. Cheese) in San Jose, California.
1980 – General Chun Doo-hwan of South Korea seizes control of the government and declares martial law in order to suppress student demonstrations.
  1980   – On the eve of presidential elections, Maoist guerrilla group Shining Path attacks a polling location in Chuschi (a town in Ayacucho), starting the Internal conflict in Peru.
1983 – The U.S. Department of Energy declassifies documents showing world's largest mercury pollution event in Oak Ridge, Tennessee (ultimately found to be ), in response to the Appalachian Observer'''s Freedom of Information Act request.
  1983   – Lebanon, Israel, and the United States sign an agreement on Israeli withdrawal from Lebanon.
1984 – Prince Charles calls a proposed addition to the National Gallery, London, a "monstrous carbuncle on the face of a much-loved and elegant friend", sparking controversies on the proper role of the Royal Family and the course of modern architecture.
1987 – Iran–Iraq War: An Iraqi Dassault Mirage F1 fighter jet fires two missiles into the U.S. Navy warship , killing 37 and injuring 21 of her crew.
1990 – The General Assembly of the World Health Organization (WHO) eliminates homosexuality from the list of psychiatric diseases.
1992 – Three days of popular protests against the government of Prime Minister of Thailand Suchinda Kraprayoon begin in Bangkok, leading to a military crackdown that results in 52 officially confirmed deaths, hundreds of injuries, many disappearances, and more than 3,500 arrests.
1994 – Malawi holds its first multi-party elections.
1995 – Shawn Nelson steals an M60 tank from the California Army National Guard Armory in San Diego and proceeds to go on a rampage.
1997 – Troops of Laurent Kabila march into Kinshasa. Zaire is officially renamed Democratic Republic of the Congo.
2000 – Arsenal and Galatasaray fans clash in the 2000 UEFA Cup Final riots in Copenhagen
2004 – The first legal same-sex marriages in the U.S. are performed in the state of Massachusetts.
2006 – The aircraft carrier  is sunk in the Gulf of Mexico as an artificial reef.
2007 – Trains from North and South Korea cross the 38th Parallel in a test-run agreed by both governments. This is the first time that trains have crossed the Demilitarized Zone since 1953.
2014 – A military plane crash in northern Laos kills 17 people.

Births

Pre-1600
1155 – Jien, Japanese monk, poet, and historian (d. 1225)
1443 – Edmund, Earl of Rutland (d. 1460)
1451 – Engelbert II of Nassau, Count of Nassau-Vianden and Lord of Breda (1475–1504) (d. 1504)
1490 – Albert, Duke of Prussia, last Grand Master of the Teutonic Knights (d. 1568)
1500 – Federico II Gonzaga, Duke of Mantua (d. 1540)
1551 – Martin Delrio, Belgian occultist and theologian (d. 1601)
1568 – Anna Vasa of Sweden, Swedish princess (d. 1625)
1601–1900
1610 – Stefano della Bella, Italian engraver and etcher (d. 1664)
1628 – Ferdinand Charles, Archduke of Austria (d. 1662)
1636 – Edward Colman, English Catholic courtier under Charles II (d. 1678)
1682 – Bartholomew Roberts, Welsh pirate (d. 1722)
1698 – Gio Nicola Buhagiar, Maltese painter (d. 1752)
1706 – Andreas Felix von Oefele, German historian and librarian (d. 1780)
1718 – Robert Darcy, 4th Earl of Holderness, English politician and diplomat, Secretary of State for the Southern Department (d. 1778)
1732 – Francesco Pasquale Ricci, Italian violinist and composer (d. 1817)
1743 – Seth Warner, American colonel (d. 1784)
1749 – Edward Jenner, English physician and microbiologist (d. 1823)
1758 – Sir John St Aubyn, 5th Baronet, English politician (d. 1839)
1768 – Caroline of Brunswick (d. 1821)
  1768   – Henry Paget, 1st Marquess of Anglesey, English general and politician, Lord Lieutenant of Ireland (d. 1854)
1794 – Anna Brownell Jameson, Irish-English author (d. 1860)
1818 – Ezra Otis Kendall, American professor, astronomer and mathematician (d. 1899)
1821 – Sebastian Kneipp, German priest and therapist (d. 1897)
1835 – Thomas McIlwraith, Scottish-Australian politician, 8th Premier of Queensland (d. 1900)
1836 – Virginie Loveling, Belgian author and poet (d. 1923)
1845 – Jacint Verdaguer, Catalan priest and poet (d. 1902)
1860 – Martin Kukučín, Slovak author and playwright (d. 1928)
  1860   – Charlotte Barnum, American mathematician and social activist (d. 1934)
1863 – Léon Gérin, Canadian lawyer, sociologist, and civil servant (d. 1951)
1864 – Louis Richardet, Swiss target shooter (d. 1923)
  1864   – Ante Trumbić, Croatian lawyer and politician, 27th Mayor of Split (d. 1938)
1866 – Erik Satie, French pianist and composer (d. 1925)
1868 – Horace Elgin Dodge, American businessman, co-founded Dodge (d. 1920)
  1868   – Panagis Tsaldaris, Greek politician, Prime Minister of Greece (d. 1936)
1870 – Newton Moore, Australian politician, 8th Premier of Western Australia (d. 1936)
1873 – Henri Barbusse, French author and journalist (d. 1935)
  1873   – Dorothy Richardson, English author and journalist (d. 1957)
1874 – George Sheldon, American diver (d. 1907)
1882 – Karl Burman, Estonian architect and painter (d. 1965)
1886 – Alfonso XIII of Spain, Spanish monarch (d. 1941)
1888 – Tich Freeman, English cricketer (d. 1965)
1889 – Dorothy Gibson, American actress and singer (d. 1946)
  1889   – Alfonso Reyes, Mexican author (d. 1959)
1891 – Napoleon Zervas, Greek general and politician (d. 1957)
1893 – Frederick McKinley Jones, American inventor and entrepreneur (d. 1961)
1895 – Saul Adler, Belarusian-English captain and parasitologist (d. 1966)
  1895   – Reinhold Saulmann, Estonian sprinter and bandy player (d. 1936)
1897 – Odd Hassel, Norwegian chemist and academic, Nobel Prize laureate (d. 1981)
1898 – A. J. Casson, Canadian painter (d. 1992)
1899 – Carmen de Icaza, Spanish writer (d. 1979)

1901–present
1901 – Werner Egk, German pianist and composer (d. 1983)
1903 – Cool Papa Bell, American baseball player and manager (d. 1991)
1904 – Marie-Anne Desmarest, French author (d. 1973)
1906 – Zinka Milanov, Croatian-American soprano and educator (d. 1989)
1909 – Julius Sumner Miller, American physicist and academic (d. 1987)
1911 – Lisa Fonssagrives, Swedish-American model (d. 1992)
  1911   – Maureen O'Sullivan, Irish-American actress (d. 1998)
1912 – Archibald Cox, American lawyer and politician, 31st United States Solicitor General (d. 2004)
  1912   – Mary Beatrice Davidson Kenner, American inventor (d. 2006)
1913 – Hans Ruesch, Swiss racing driver and author (d. 2007)
1914 – Robert N. Thompson, American-Canadian chiropractor and politician (d. 1997)
1918 – Joan Benham, English actress (d. 1981)
  1918   – Birgit Nilsson, Swedish operatic soprano (d. 2005)
1919 – Antonio Aguilar, Mexican singer-songwriter, producer, actor, and screenwriter (d. 2007)
  1919   – Gustav Naan, Russian-Estonian physicist and philosopher (d. 1994)
1920 – Harry Männil, Estonian-Venezuelan businessman, co-founded ACO Group (d. 2010)
1921 – Dennis Brain, English horn player (d. 1957)
  1921   – Bob Merrill, American composer and screenwriter (d. 1998)
1922 – Jean Rédélé, French racing driver, founded Alpine (d. 2007)
1923 – Michael Beetham, English commander and pilot (d. 2015)
1924 – Roy Bentley, English footballer (d. 2018)
  1924   – Francis Tombs, Baron Tombs, English engineer and politician (d. 2020)
1926 – David Ogilvy, 13th Earl of Airlie, English-Scottish soldier and politician
  1926   – Dietmar Schönherr, Austrian-Spanish actor, director, and screenwriter (d. 2014)
  1926   – Franz Sondheimer, German-English chemist and academic (d. 1981)
1929 – Branko Zebec, Yugoslav football player and coach (d. 1988)
1931 – Marshall Applewhite, American cult leader, founded Heaven's Gate (d. 1997)
  1931   – Dewey Redman, American saxophonist (d. 2006)         
1932 – Rodric Braithwaite, English soldier and diplomat, British Ambassador to Russia
  1932   – Peter Burge, Australian cricketer (d. 2001)
1933 – Yelena Gorchakova, Russian javelin thrower (d. 2002)
1934 – Friedrich-Wilhelm Kiel, German educator and politician
  1934   – Earl Morrall, American football player and coach (d. 2014)
  1934   – Ronald Wayne, American computer scientist, co-founded Apple Computer
1935 – Dennis Potter, English voice actor, director, producer, and screenwriter (d. 1994)
1936 – Dennis Hopper, American actor and director (d. 2010)
1937 – Hazel R. O'Leary, American lawyer and politician, 7th United States Secretary of Energy
1938 – Jason Bernard, American actor (d. 1996)
  1938   – Marcia Freedman, Israeli activist 
  1938   – Pervis Jackson, American R&B bass singer (d. 2008)
1939 – Hugh Dykes, Baron Dykes, English politician
  1939   – Gary Paulsen, American author (d. 2021)
1940 – Alan Kay, American computer scientist and academic
  1940   – Reynato Puno, Filipino lawyer and jurist, 22nd Chief Justice of the Supreme Court of the Philippines
1941 – David Cope, American composer and author
  1941   – Ben Nelson, American lawyer and politician, 37th Governor of Nebraska
1942 – Taj Mahal, American blues singer-songwriter and musician
1943 – Sirajuddin of Perlis, Yang di-Pertuan Agong of Malaysia
  1943   – Johnny Warren, Australian footballer, coach, and sportscaster (d. 2004)
1944 – Jesse Winchester, American singer-songwriter, guitarist, and producer (d. 2014)
1945 – B.S. Chandrasekhar, Indian cricketer
  1945   – Tony Roche, Australian tennis player and coach
1946 – Udo Lindenberg, German singer-songwriter and drummer 
1947 – Stephen Platten, English bishop
1948 – Dick Gaughan, Scottish singer-songwriter and guitarist
1949 – Bill Bruford, English drummer, songwriter, and producer 
  1949   – Keith, American pop singer
1950 – Howard Ashman, American playwright and composer (d. 1991)
  1950   – Keith Bradley, Baron Bradley, English accountant and politician
  1950   – Janez Drnovšek, Slovenian economist and politician, 2nd President of Slovenia (d. 2008)
  1950   – Alan Johnson, English politician, Shadow Chancellor of the Exchequer
  1950   – Valeriya Novodvorskaya, Russian journalist and politician (d. 2014)
1951 – Simon Hughes, English lawyer and politician
1952 – Howard Hampton, Canadian lawyer and politician
1954 – Michael Roberts, South African-English jockey
1955 – Bill Paxton, American actor and director (d. 2017)
  1955   – David Townsend, American singer-songwriter and guitarist (d. 2005)
1956 – Sugar Ray Leonard, American boxer
  1956   – Annise Parker, American politician
  1956   – Bob Saget, American comedian, actor, and television host (d. 2022)
  1956   – Dave Sim, Canadian cartoonist and author
1957 – Pascual Pérez, Dominican baseball player (d. 2012)
1958 – Paul Di'Anno, English rock singer-songwriter
1959 – Marcelo Loffreda, Argentine rugby player and coach
1960 – Lou DiBella, American boxing promoter, actor, and producer
  1960   – Simon Fuller, English talent manager and producer, created the Idols series1961 – Enya, Irish singer-songwriter and producer 
  1961   – Jamil Azzaoui, Canadian singer-songwriter and guitarist
  1961   – Justin King, English businessman
1962 – Lise Lyng Falkenberg, Danish journalist and author
  1962   – Andrew Farrar, Australian rugby league player and coach
  1962   – Craig Ferguson, Scottish-American comedian, actor, and talk show host
  1962   – Jane Moore, English journalist and author
  1962   – Rosalind Picard, American computer scientist and engineer, co-founded Affectiva
1963 – Jon Koncak, American basketball player
  1963   – Page McConnell, American keyboard player and songwriter 
1964 – Stratos Apostolakis, Greek footballer and coach
  1964   – Mauro Martini, Italian race car driver
  1964   – Menno Oosting, Dutch tennis player (d. 1999)
1965 – Trent Reznor, American singer-songwriter, multi-instrumentalist, and producer 
  1965   – Jeremy Vine, English journalist and author
1966 – Qusay Hussein, Iraqi soldier and politician (d. 2003)
  1966   – Mark Kratzmann, Australian tennis player and coach
  1966   – Danny Manning, American basketball player and coach
  1966   – Gilles Quénéhervé, French sprinter
1967 – Mohamed Nasheed, Maldivian lawyer and politician 4th President of the Maldives
  1967   – Patrick Ortlieb, Austrian skier
1968 – Dave Abbruzzese, American rock drummer and songwriter
1969 – Keith Hill, English footballer and manager
1970 – Hubert Davis, American basketball player and coach
  1970   – Jordan Knight, American singer-songwriter and actor
  1970   – Matt Lindland, American mixed martial artist, wrestler, and politician
  1970   – Jodie Rogers, Australian diver
  1970   – René Vilbre, Estonian director and screenwriter
1971 – Mark Connors, Australian rugby player
  1971   – Shaun Hart, Australian footballer, coach, and sportscaster
  1971   – Stella Jongmans, Dutch athlete
  1971   – Queen Máxima of the Netherlands, Dutch royal
  1971   – Gina Raimondo, Governor of Rhode Island
1972 – Barry Hayles, English born Jamaican international footballer
1973 – Josh Homme, American singer-songwriter, guitarist, and producer 
1974 – Andrea Corr, Irish singer-songwriter, pianist, and actress 
  1974   – Wiki González, Venezuelan baseball player
  1974   – Eddie Lewis, American international soccer player
1975 – Marcelinho Paraíba, Brazilian footballer
  1975   – Alex Wright, German wrestler
1976 – Kandi Burruss, American singer-songwriter, producer, and actress 
  1976   – Shayne Dunley, Australian rugby league player
  1976   – José Guillén, Dominican-American baseball player
  1976   – Daniel Komen, Kenyan runner
  1976   – Wang Leehom, American-Taiwanese singer-songwriter, producer, actor, and director
  1976   – Mayte Martínez, Spanish runner
  1976   – Kirsten Vlieghuis, Dutch freestyle swimmer
1978 – John Foster, American baseball player and coach
  1978   – Paddy Kenny, English footballer
  1978   – Carlos Peña, Dominican-American baseball player
  1978   – Magdalena Zděnovcová, Czech tennis player
1979 – David Jarolím, Czech footballer
  1979   – Wayne Thomas, English footballer
1980 – Davor Džalto, Bosnian historian and philosopher
  1980   – Fredrik Kessiakoff, Swedish cyclist
  1980   – Alistair Overeem, Dutch mixed martial artist and kickboxer
  1980   – Ariën van Weesenbeek, Dutch drummer
1981 – Beñat Albizuri, Spanish cyclist
  1981   – Leon Osman, English footballer
  1981   – Lim Jeong-hee, South Korean singer
  1981   – Chris Skidmore, English historian and politician
  1981   – Giannis Taralidis, Greek footballer
1982 – Matt Cassel, American football player
  1982   – Dan Hardy, English mixed martial artist
  1982   – Reiko Nakamura, Japanese swimmer
  1982   – Tony Parker, French-American basketball player
  1982   – Chloe Smith, English politician
1983 – Channing Frye, American basketball player
  1983   – Chris Henry, American football player (d. 2009)
  1983   – Nicky Hofs, Dutch footballer
  1983   – Kevin Kingston, Australian rugby league player
  1983   – Jeremy Sowers, American baseball player
1984 – Christian Bolaños, Costa Rican footballer
  1984   – Christine Ohuruogu, English runner
  1984   – Christine Robinson, Canadian water polo player 
  1984   – Passenger, English singer-songwriter and musician 
1985 – Teófilo Gutiérrez, Colombian footballer 
  1985   – Derek Hough, American actor, singer, and dancer 
  1985   – Christine Nesbitt, Canadian speed skater
  1985   – Todd Redmond, American baseball player
  1985   – Matt Ryan, American football player
1986 – Marius Činikas, Lithuanian footballer
  1986   – Timo Simonlatser, Estonian skier
  1986   – Jodie Taylor, English footballer
1987 – Edvald Boasson Hagen, Norwegian cyclist
  1987   – Aleandro Rosi, Italian footballer
1988 – Nikki Reed, American actress, singer, and screenwriter
1989 – Mose Masoe, New Zealand rugby league player
  1989   – Rain Raadik, Estonian basketball player
  1989   – Tessa Virtue, Canadian ice dancer
1990 – Will Clyburn, American basketball player
  1990   – Fabian Giefer, German footballer
  1990   – Charlie Gubb, New Zealand rugby league player
  1990   – Katrina Hart, English runner
  1990   – Guido Pella, Argentine tennis player 
1991 – Johanna Konta, Australian-English tennis player
  1991   – Adil Omar, Pakistani rapper and music producer
  1991   – Abigail Raye, Canadian field hockey player
1994 – Julie Anne San Jose, Filipina singer-songwriter

Deaths
Pre-1600
 528 – Empress Dowager Hu of Northern Wei
   528   – Yuan Yong, imperial prince of Northern Wei
   528   – Yuan Zhao, emperor of Northern Wei (b. 526)
 896 – Liu Jianfeng, Chinese warlord
 924 – Li Maozhen, Chinese warlord and king (b. 856)
 946 – Al-Qa'im bi-Amr Allah, Fatimid caliph (b. 893)
1299 – Daumantas of Pskov, Lithuanian prince (b. c. 1240)
1336 – Go-Fushimi, emperor of Japan (b. 1288)
1365 – Louis II, Elector of Brandenburg (b. 1328)
1395 – Konstantin Dejanović/Constantine Dragaš, Serbian ruler (b. 1355)
1464 – Thomas de Ros, 9th Baron de Ros, English politician (b. 1427)
1510 – Sandro Botticelli, Italian painter (b. 1445)
1521 – Edward Stafford, 3rd Duke of Buckingham, Welsh politician, Lord High Constable of England (b. 1478)
1536 – George Boleyn, 2nd Viscount Rochford, English courtier and diplomat, Lord Warden of the Cinque Ports (b. 1504)
  1536   – William Brereton, English courtier (b. 1487)
  1536   – Henry Norris, English courtier (b. 1482)
1546 – Philipp von Hutten, German explorer (b. 1511)
1551 – Shin Saimdang, South Korean poet and calligraphist (b. 1504)
1558 – Francisco de Sá de Miranda, Portuguese poet (b. 1485)
1575 – Matthew Parker, English archbishop and academic (b. 1504)
1601-1900
1606 – False Dmitriy I, pretender to the Russian throne (b. 1582)
1607 – Anna d'Este, French princess (b. 1531)
1626 – Joan Pau Pujol, Catalan organist and composer (b. 1570)
1643 – Giovanni Picchi, Italian organist and composer (b. 1571)
1727 – Catherine I of Russia (b. 1684)
1729 – Samuel Clarke, English clergyman and philosopher (b. 1675)
1765 – Alexis Clairaut, French mathematician, astronomer, and geophysicist (b. 1713)
1797 – Michel-Jean Sedaine, French playwright and composer (b. 1719)
1801 – William Heberden, English physician and scholar (b. 1710)
1807 – John Gunby, American general (b. 1745)
1809 – Leopold Auenbrugger, Austrian physician (b. 1722)
1822 – Armand-Emmanuel de Vignerot du Plessis, Duc de Richelieu, French general and politician, 2nd Prime Minister of France (b. 1766)
1829 – John Jay, American politician and diplomat, 1st Chief Justice of the United States (b. 1745)
1838 – René Caillié, French explorer and author (b. 1799)
  1838   – Charles Maurice de Talleyrand-Périgord, French politician, Prime Minister of France (b. 1754)
1839 – Archibald Alison, Scottish priest and author (b. 1757)
1868 – Kondō Isami, Japanese commander (b. 1834)
1875 – John C. Breckinridge, American lawyer and politician, 14th Vice President of the United States, Confederate States general (b. 1821)
1879 – Asa Packer, American businessman, founded Lehigh University (b. 1805)
1880 – Ziya Pasha, Greek author and translator (b. 1826)
1886 – John Deere, American blacksmith and businessman, founded the Deere & Company (b. 1804)
1888 – Giacomo Zanella, Italian priest and poet (b. 1820)

1900-present
1911 – Frederick August Otto Schwarz, German-American businessman, founded FAO Schwarz (b. 1836)
1916 – Boris Borisovich Golitsyn, Russian physicist and seismologist (b. 1862)
1917 – Clara Ayres, American nurse (b. 1880)
  1917   – Charles Brooke, Rajah of Sarawak (b. 1829)
1919 – Guido von List, Austrian-German journalist, author, and poet (b. 1848)
1921 – Karl Mantzius, Danish actor and director (b. 1860)
1922 – Dorothy Levitt, English racing driver and journalist (b. 1882)
1927 – Harold Geiger, American pilot and lieutenant (b. 1884)
1934 – Cass Gilbert, American architect (b. 1859)
1935 – Paul Dukas, French composer, critic, and educator (b. 1865)
1936 – Panagis Tsaldaris, Greek lawyer and politician, 124th Prime Minister of Greece (b. 1868)
1938 – Jakob Ehrlich, Czech-Austrian academic and politician (b. 1877)
1943 – Johanna Elberskirchen, German author and activist (b. 1864)
1947 – George Forbes, New Zealand farmer and politician, 22nd Prime Minister of New Zealand (b. 1869)
1951 – William Birdwood, Anglo-Indian field marshal (b. 1865)
1960 – Jules Supervielle, Uruguayan-French poet and author (b. 1884)
1963 – John Wilce, American football player, coach, and physician (b. 1888)
1964 – Nandor Fodor, Hungarian-American psychologist and parapsychologist (b. 1895)
1974 – Ernest Nash, German-American photographer and scholar (b. 1898)
1977 – Charles E. Rosendahl, American admiral and pilot (b. 1892)
1980 – Gündüz Kılıç, Turkish football player and coach (b. 1918)
1985 – Abe Burrows, American director, composer, and author (b. 1910)
1987 – Gunnar Myrdal, Swedish economist, sociologist, and politician, Nobel Prize laureate (b. 1898)
1992 – Lawrence Welk, American accordion player and bandleader (b. 1903)
1995 – Toe Blake, Canadian ice hockey player and coach (b. 1912)
1996 – Kevin Gilbert, American singer-songwriter and producer (b. 1966)
1999 – Bruce Fairbairn, Canadian trumpet player and producer (b. 1949)
  1999   – Lembit Oll, Estonian chess Grandmaster (b. 1966)
2000 – Donald Coggan, English archbishop (b. 1909)
2001 – Jacques-Louis Lions, French mathematician (b. 1928)
  2001   – Frank G. Slaughter, American physician and author (b. 1908)
2002 – László Kubala, Hungarian-Spanish footballer, coach, and manager (b. 1927)
  2002   – Aşık Mahzuni Şerif, Turkish poet and composer (b. 1940)
2004 – Jørgen Nash, Danish poet and painter (b. 1920)
  2004   – Tony Randall, American actor (b. 1920)
  2004   – Ezzedine Salim, Iraqi politician (b. 1943)
2005 – Frank Gorshin, American actor (b. 1934)
2006 – Cy Feuer, American director, producer, and composer (b. 1911)
2007 – Lloyd Alexander, American soldier and author (b. 1924)
  2007   – T. K. Doraiswamy, Indian poet and author (b. 1921)
2009 – Mario Benedetti, Uruguayan journalist, author, and poet (b. 1920)
  2009   – Jung Seung-hye, South Korean journalist and producer (b. 1965)
2010 – Yvonne Loriod, French pianist, composer, and educator (b. 1924)
  2010   – Walasse Ting, Chinese-American painter and poet (b. 1929)
2011 – Harmon Killebrew, American baseball player and sportscaster (b. 1936)
2012 – Gideon Ezra, Israeli geographer and politician, Israeli Minister in the Prime Minister's Office (b. 1937)
  2012   – Patrick Mafisango, Congolese-Rwandan footballer (b. 1980)
  2012   – Donna Summer, American singer-songwriter (b. 1948)
2013 – Philippe Gaumont, French cyclist (b. 1973)
  2013   – Peter Schulz, German politician, Mayor of Hamburg (b. 1930)
  2013   – Ken Venturi, American golfer and sportscaster (b. 1931)
  2013   – Jorge Rafael Videla, Argentine Commander in Chief and dictator (b. 1925)
2014 – Gerald Edelman, American biologist and immunologist, Nobel Prize laureate (b. 1929)
  2014   – C. P. Krishnan Nair, Indian businessman, founded The Leela Palaces, Hotels and Resorts (b. 1922)
  2014   – Douangchay Phichit, Laotian politician (b. 1944)
  2014   – Thongbanh Sengaphone, Laotian politician (b. 1953)
2015 – Lionel Pickens, American rapper (b. 1983)
2017 – Todor Veselinović, Serbian football player and manager (b. 1930)
2019 – Herman Wouk, American author (b. 1915)
2020 – Lucky Peterson, American blues singer, keyboardist and guitarist (b. 1964)
2022 – Vangelis,  Greek musician, composer (b. 1943)

Holidays and observances
Birthday of the Raja (Perlis)
Christian feast day:
Giulia Salzano
Paschal Baylon
William Hobart Hare (Episcopal Church (USA))
Restituta
May 17 (Eastern Orthodox liturgics)
Children's Day (Norway)
Constitution Day (Nauru)
Constitution Day (Norway)
Feast of ‘Aẓamat (Baháʼí Faith, day shifts with March Equinox, see List of observances set by the Baháʼí calendar)
Galician Literature Day or Día das Letras Galegas'' (Galicia)
International Day Against Homophobia, Transphobia and Biphobia
Liberation Day (Democratic Republic of the Congo)
National Day Against Homophobia (Canada)
Navy Day (Argentina)
Norwegian Constitution Day
World Hypertension Day
World Information Society Day (International)

References

External links

 BBC: On This Day
 
 Historical Events on May 17

Days of the year
May